Permanence is the state of being permanent:
Digital permanence
Object permanence
Print permanence

In popular culture:
Permanence (novel) by Karl Schroeder

In science:
The inverse of inductance.

In music:
 Permanence (album), a 2015 album by No Devotion

See also
 Impermanence, an essential doctrine of Buddhism
 Permanent (disambiguation)